Louise-Anastasia Serment (1642 in Grenoble – 1692 in Paris) was a French natural philosopher and poet. Born in Grenoble, she spent most of her life in Paris. She was a disciple of Descartes. She was a member of the Ricovrati Academy. Serment reputedly collaborated as an author with Philippe Quinault in his operas.

References

 Renate Strohmeier: Lexikon der Naturwissenschaftlerinnen und naturkundigen Frauen Europas, 1998
 Jane Stevenson: Women Latin Poets: Language, Gender, and Authority, from Antiquity to the Eighteenth century, 2005

1642 births
1692 deaths
17th-century French women writers
17th-century writers
Natural philosophers
French women philosophers
17th-century philosophers
French philosophers
French women poets
17th-century French poets